Joseph William Coyle (February 26, 1953 – August 15, 1993) was an unemployed longshoreman in Philadelphia who, in February 1981, found $1.2 million in the street, after it had fallen out of the back of an armored car, and kept it. His story was made into the 1993 film Money for Nothing, starring John Cusack, as well as a 2002 book by Mark Bowden, Finders Keepers: The Story of a Man Who Found $1 Million.

Coyle passed out some of the money, in $100 bills, to friends and neighbors. He was arrested later in 1981 at JFK Airport while trying to check into a flight to Acapulco; police found $105,000 of the cash in envelopes taped around his ankles. He was tried, but found not guilty of theft by reason of temporary insanity. The armored car company, Purolator Armored Services, eventually recovered around $1 million of the original amount.

Coyle struggled with drug addiction for most of his adult life.  He committed suicide by hanging in his basement on August 15, 1993, less than a month before the film Money for Nothing was released. That was also around the time he was to be sentenced for his sixth drug conviction.

References

External links 
 

1953 births
1993 suicides
People from Philadelphia
Suicides by hanging in Pennsylvania
Suicides in Philadelphia
1993 deaths
American people convicted of drug offenses